Sainthal (some times pronounced as Senthal or Saithal) is a nagar panchayat in Nawabganj tehsil, Bareilly district, Uttar Pradesh, India.

History
The ancient name of this town was Sherthal (Land of Lions) which evolved into Sainthal over the time 

Sainthal is said to have been founded by Syed Jalal-ul-Deen Lad Baraha and his son Syed Amanullah Baraha, both courtiers of Akbar the Great, who received this area from the Sultan of Delhi after his victory over the joint army of Muzaffar Khan and Mitrasen.

Geography
It is situated on Hafizganj-Jaadopur road, 4 km away from NH-30 and 32 km away from Bareilly City. It is well connected by Indian Railways.

There are also some ruins of small fort still present in form of "Teela" in southern part of Sainthal.

Demographics
As per 2011 Census of India the total population of Sainthal is 15,332 out of which 7,916 are males and 7,416 are females thus the Average Sex Ratio of Sainthal is 937. Sainthal is mainly home to Zaidi Sayyids.

The population of children of age 0–6 years in Sainthal city is 2176 which is 14% of the total population. There are 1097 male children and 1079 female children between the age 0–6 years. Thus as per the Census 2011 the Child Sex Ratio of Sainthal is 984 which is greater than Average Sex Ratio (937).

As per the 2011 Census of India the literacy rate of Sainthal is 56.2%. Thus Sainthal has lower literacy rate compared to 58.5% of Bareilly district. The male literacy rate is 54.9% and the female literacy rate is 41.2% in Sainthal.

References

Villages in Bareilly district